Zillingtal is a community of 925 inhabitants in the West of the district of Eisenstadt-Umgebung in  Austria's federal state Burgenland.

There is a minority population of Burgenland Croats.

Population

References

Geography 
The community is situated in the North of Burgenland close to the Lower Austrian Border.

History 
Before Christ, the community was part of the Celtic kingdom Noricum and part of the environment of the Celtic hilltop settlement Burgberg.

Later on, under the governance of the Roman Empire, the community of Zillingtal was situated in the province of Pannonia.

There is an Avaric field of tombs from the 7th and 8th century, that has been discovered in 1927.

The name of Zillingtal was first mentioned officially in 1271. In 1529 and in 1683 Zillingtal was destroyed by the Turkish Army. Afterwards, Croatians refilled the population which had been destroyed by the Turkish wars. Until 1920/21 Zillingtal was part of Hungary, as well as the rest of Burgenland. From 1898 the Hungarian Magyarising politics enforced by the Hungarian government in Budapest made the use of the Hungarian name of Zillingtal, Völfyfalu, mandatory.

After the end of the First World War, Burgenland was, after a number of negotiations at St. Germain and Trianon in 1919 integrated to Austria.

Politics 
Mayor of Zillingtal is Johann Fellinger, member of SPÖ. Vize-Mayor is Karl Aibler, member of ÖVP. Head Official is Eva Karacson.

The local council which has 15 seats as a whole, is composed this way: SPÖ 8 seats, ÖVP 6 and LBL 1.

Cities and towns in Eisenstadt-Umgebung District